Colin Richard Smith (born 3 November 1958) is an English former footballer who played in the Football League as a defender for Nottingham Forest, Norwich City, Cardiff City and Aldershot, in non-league football for Wokingham Town, and in Hong Kong for Sea Bee.

References

1958 births
Living people
People from Ruddington
Footballers from Nottinghamshire
English footballers
Association football defenders
Nottingham Forest F.C. players
Norwich City F.C. players
Sea Bee players
Cardiff City F.C. players
Aldershot F.C. players
Wokingham Town F.C. players
English Football League players